Iraj Zebardast (ايرج زبردست in Persian) is an Iranian poet mostly known for his quatrains. He was born in Shiraz.

Works
 Everyone's in love when it rains
 Wet Smiles
 A basket of mirrors
 Another life of passing day
 My letters to Oma

Books about Iraj Zebardast
 Maryam Roshan, Another Khayyám ... Selection of Iraj Zebardast's works
 Most disturbing songs – Quatrains from the age of Khayyám until the age of Zebardast

See also

Omar Khayyám

References

 :fa:ايرج زبردست

External links
 Iraj Zebardast website 
 Iraj Zebardast's blog

People from Shiraz
Iranian male writers
Male poets
20th-century Iranian poets
21st-century Iranian poets
Living people
20th-century male writers
21st-century male writers
Year of birth missing (living people)